The Beheaded 1000 (also known as The Executioner) is a 1991 Taiwanese martial arts film starring Jimmy Wang Yu, Joey Wong and Monica Chan.

Plot
Ren, the royal executioner, nears his 1,000th beheading when The Eight Devilish Mortals, a criminal gang Ren beheaded years ago, returns from the afterlife seeking revenge.

References

External links

1991 films
Taiwanese martial arts films
1990s Mandarin-language films
Films directed by Ting Shan-hsi